Universitario Popayán was a professional Colombian football team based in Popayán, that played in the Categoría Primera B from 2011 to 2019. They played their home games at the Ciro López stadium.

History
Universitario Popayán was founded in May 2011, after Centauros Villavicencio moved from Villavicencio to Popayán considering Centauros's huge debts, the refusal of financial support from successive local authorities that deemed it a feeder club for Deportes Quindío, and the support expressed from the Cauca Department Governorate for a football club in the department's capital city. Despite the fact that the move was made before the start of the Finalización tournament, the club played for the rest of the year under its former name "Centauros" due to legal issues. They were authorized by Coldeportes to use the name "Universitario de Popayán" from the 2012 season onwards. Starting from that season the club began working in Popayán, as well as forming players in its youth ranks who would go on to play in the Colombian U-19 championships.

The club's history was marked by the continuous exchange of players with Deportes Quindío (which came from the Centauros era), given that the club's owner, Hernando Ángel, was also Deportes Quindío's controlling shareholder and chairman.

On 12 March 2019, the General Assembly of DIMAYOR approved a proposal to relocate Universitario from Popayán to Cali starting from the second half of the 2019 season, with the club being effectively rebranded as Boca Juniors de Cali. Universitario played its last Primera B match under that name on 4 May 2019, losing to Deportivo Pereira in Palmira by a 4–1 score, and its last official game was a 2–1 defeat against América de Cali in the sixth and last matchday of the group stage of the 2019 Copa Colombia on 8 May.

Stadium

Affiliated teams
  Deportes Quindío

External links
 Official Site

References

Association football clubs established in 2011
Association football clubs disestablished in 2019
Defunct football clubs in Colombia
Football clubs in Colombia
Categoría Primera B clubs
Popayán